Sury-ès-Bois is a commune in the Cher department in the Centre-Val de Loire region of France.

Geography
The commune’s territory is the source of several small rivers.

Population

Sights
 The church of St. Martin, dating from the fifteenth century.
 The manorhouse of l'Asnerie.
 Traces of the old priory of Saint-Anne.
 The thirteenth-century chapel of the chateau of Charpignon.

See also
Communes of the Cher department

References

Communes of Cher (department)